The Forbes family includes a number of related people that founded, and have worked for, Forbes magazine. The family has close ties to Princeton University, with their namesake Forbes College as one of Princeton's residential colleges. Noted members include:
 Bertie Charles Forbes, a.k.a. B.C. Forbes (1880–1954), the founder of the magazine
 Bruce Charles Forbes (1916–1964), eldest son of B.C. Forbes
 Malcolm Stevenson Forbes (1919–1990), son and successor of B.C. Forbes
 Steve Forbes a.k.a. Malcolm Forbes Jr. (b, 1947), son of Malcolm Forbes, current editor-in-chief and former chairman, president, and CEO of the company
 Moira Forbes (b. 1979), daughter of Steve Forbes
 Christopher Forbes (b. 1950), son of Malcolm Forbes, former Vice Chairman and a Vice Chancellor of the American Association of the Sovereign Military Order of Malta
 Robert Laidlaw Forbes, son of Malcolm Forbes
 Tim Forbes, son of Malcolm Forbes and former president and chief operating officer

 
American families of Scottish ancestry
Business families of the United States